John Pankow (born April 28, 1954) is an American actor. He began his career on-stage in New York, in numerous Off-Broadway and Broadway plays including Peter Shaffer's Amadeus, John Patrick Shanley's Italian American Reconciliation, and Brian Friel's Aristocrats. After a starring role in William Friedkin's To Live and Die in L.A., he began appearing regularly in film and on television, playing Ira Buchman for all eight seasons of Mad About You and later Merc Lapidus on Episodes.

Early life and education
Pankow was born in St. Louis, Missouri, to a Catholic family of German and Irish descent, the sixth of nine siblings. His elder brother is trombonist/composer James Pankow, a founding member of the rock group Chicago. Pankow grew up in Park Ridge, Illinois, and attended Maine South High School and Northeastern Illinois University.

He left the university in his junior year after he attended a performance of David Mamet's The American Buffalo at the St. Nicholas Theater. Inspired by the play, he enrolled in the theater's two-year theatrical training program in order to concentrate solely on acting.

Career

While visiting a friend in New York City, Pankow auditioned for, and won, a role in an episode of PBS' Great Performances entitled "Life on the Mississippi". He went on to perform in several Off-Broadway productions including Aristocrats, Italian American Reconciliation, and the New York Shakespeare Festival's The Tempest, Two Gentlemen of Verona and Henry VIII. He subsequently made it to Broadway with Serious Money, The Iceman Cometh, and as Wolfgang Amadeus Mozart in Amadeus, replacing Tim Curry in the role and subsequently replacing him for a touring production.

After minor supporting roles in The Hunger and Rambo: First Blood Part II, he had his first starring role on-screen in To Live and Die in L.A. as rookie Secret Service agent John Vukovich, starring opposite William Petersen and Willem Dafoe. Pankow was cast after director William Friedkin deliberately sought out young, relatively-unknown stage actors for the project. After casting fellow Chicagoan Petersen, the old friend reached out to Pankow, who brought him to Friedkin who cast him on the spot.

He subsequently appeared for eight seasons as Ira Buchman on the NBC sitcom Mad About You, where he was nominated for four Screen Actors Guild Awards for Outstanding Performance by an Ensemble in a Comedy Series. He was a series regular on the Showtime/BBC series Episodes, playing American television executive Merc Lapidus. He has since appeared in numerous films and television series.

Personal life
Pankow has been married to actress Kristine Sutherland since 1986, and they have one daughter together. He resides in New York City.

Stage credits

Filmography

Film

Television

References

External links

20th-century American male actors
21st-century American male actors
American male film actors
American male stage actors
American male television actors
Northeastern Illinois University alumni
Male actors from St. Louis
Actors from Park Ridge, Illinois
American people of German descent
American people of Irish descent
1954 births
Living people